Namrata Thapa is an Indian film and television actress. She appeared in Yahaaan Main Ghar Ghar Kheli as Swarnlata Raj Singhania.

Personal life
Thapa was born in Delhi and now resides in Mumbai. She graduated from Delhi University.She did most of movies with his favourite actor Siddhanta Mahapatra.

Career
Thapa began her acting career with  Ssshhhh...Koi Hai - Doosri Dulhan as Nikita (Pahadi Raja's sister) in Episode 18. The shoot was supposed to be happening in Jaipur and they were auditioning for some roles in Delhi. She was doing modeling in Delhi and was 16 years old at that time. At the age of 18 and half, she came to Mumbai.  Vaidehi was her first show after coming to Mumbai, after which she appeared in shows such as Stree Teri Kahaani,  Naaginn, Kuch Apne Kuch Paraye, Kahiin To Hoga, Mera Naam Karegi Roshan, Yahaaan Main Ghar Ghar Kheli, Jhilmil Sitaaron Ka Aangan Hoga, Badalte Rishton Ki Dastaan and Tum Aise Hi Rehna. She appeared in Yahaaan Main Ghar Ghar Kheli as Swarnlata Raj Singhania.

Thapa has also done a few regional movies such as 143 - I Love You in Odia, and has also appeared in Bengali and Bhojpuri films. In 2015, she debuted in Bollywood in a role as manager of an NGO in Prem Ratan Dhan Paayo.

As of September 2016, she is appearing in Sanyukt.

Films
 2015: Prem Ratan Dhan Paayo as NGO manager
 2014: Ganja Ladhei as Girl in a dance (special appearance)
 2014: Sindura as Debi
 2011: 143 - I Love You as Sandhya
 2010: Knock Out as Roshini
 2009: Abhisek Bhojpuri Film with Siddhant Mohapatra 
 2009: Mitare Meeta as Nandini
 2008: Gharjamai
 2008: Golmaal as Khushi
 2007: Rasika Nagar as Priya / Mita
 2007: Mu Tate Love Karuchi
2007:Ziddi Odia film Along With Samantha Ruth Prabhu and Siddhant Mohapatra 
 2006: I Love My India as Sonia Mahapatra
 2006: Prema Rutu Aslilare
 2005: Priya Mo Priya as Priya
 2005: Dulha Milal Dildaar with Ravi kishan 
 2005: I Love You as Mita
 2005: To Paain

Television
 2015 : Adhikaar ek kasam ek tapasya
 2006-2009: Stree Teri Kahani as Tara
 2009: Yahaan Main Ghar Ghar Kheli as Swarnlata Raj Singhania
Mahima Shanidev Ki as Vikramaditya's wife
2007-08: Raavan as Sita
 2007: Ssshhhh...Phir Koi Hai - Hospital as Inspector Putul (Episode 43)
2006: Vaidehi as Maithili
 2001: Ssshhhh...Koi Hai - Doosri Dulhan as Nikita (Episode 18)
 2001: Ssshhhh...Koi Hai - Woh Koun Thi as Sonia (Episode 14)

References

Actresses from Mumbai
Indian television actresses
Living people
1962 births